Thomas, Tommy or Tom Doyle may refer to:

Politicians
 Thomas Doyle (Australian politician) (1885–1951), New South Wales politician
 Thomas Doyle (Canadian politician) (1932–2007), politician in Newfoundland, Canada
 Thomas A. Doyle (Illinois politician) (1886–1935), U.S. Representative from Illinois
 Thomas A. Doyle (mayor) (1827–1886), mayor of Providence, Rhode Island for 18 years
 Thomas Francis Doyle (1893–1968), member of the New Zealand Legislative Council
 Thomas H. Doyle (1863–1949), Oklahoma politician and judge

Sportspeople
 Thomas Doyle (rugby league) (born 1999), English rugby league
 Tom Doyle (born 1992), New Zealand footballer
 Tommy Doyle (American football) (born 1998), American football offensive lineman
 Tommy Doyle (baseball) (born 1996), American baseball player
 Tommy Doyle (footballer, born 2001), English footballer
 Tommy Doyle (Gaelic footballer) (born 1956), played for Kerry
 Tommy Doyle (Tipperary hurler) (1915–1988), Irish hurler
 Tommy Doyle (Westmeath hurler) (born 1993), Irish hurler 
 A. Thomas Doyle (1917–1989), American racehorse trainer

Others
 Thomas Doyle (priest) (1793–1879), English Roman Catholic priest
 Thomas P. Doyle (born 1944), American Catholic priest